Falkland Road railway station served the village of Freuchie, Fife, Scotland from 1847 to 1958 on the Edinburgh and Northern Railway. It lay almost 1 kilometre to the south of the village at the north end of the Markinch Gap.

History 
The station opened on 20 September 1847 by the Edinburgh and Northern Railway. To the northwest was the goods yard and at the north end of the southbound platform was the signal box. The station closed to both passengers and goods traffic on 15 September 1958.

References 

Disused railway stations in Fife
Former North British Railway stations
Railway stations in Great Britain opened in 1847
Railway stations in Great Britain closed in 1958
1847 establishments in Scotland
1958 disestablishments in Scotland